Valentina Ramírez Avitia (14 February 1893 - 4 April 1979) was a Mexican revolutionary and soldadera. She was known as "La Valentina" and "La leona de Norotal". She fought against the Federales in the Mexican Revolution at a time when women were not allowed to join the army. Her parallels to the story of Hua Mulan lead to her modern nickname of "The Mexican Mulan".

Biography
Avitia was born in Norotol, Durango on 14 February 1893. Inspired by her father who was killed early in the Mexican Revolution, she decided to enlist. Wearing her brothers clothes, hiding her hair, and assuming the name of Juan Ramírez, Avitia joined the Maderista Army under Francisco I. Madero in 1910. She quickly rose to the rank of lieutenant after a victorious battle in Culiacán. However, after participating in the conflict for only five months and ten days, it was discovered that Avitia was a woman. On June 22, 1911, she was dismissed from the army.

Upon her return home, Avitia was shunned by her family. She moved to Culiacán and lived there for over twenty years. In 1969, she was hit by a car in the city of Navolato. She was placed in a nursing home before she escaped. Crippled and without a wheelchair, she lived in a small scrap-metal hut and begged for food. On 4 April 1979, Avitia died of burn wounds received after a fire in her home.

Legacy
The corrido  was composed as a tribute to Avitia. The film La Valentina and the 1966 remake were later inspired by the corrido.

Valentina brand hot sauce is named in her honor.

See also
Amelio Robles Ávila
Petra Herrera
Ángela Jiménez
María Quinteras de Meras

References

Mexican revolutionaries
Female revolutionaries
1893 births
1979 deaths